Viliam Judák (born 9 November 1957 in Harvelka) is the Diocesan Bishop of Nitra, Slovakia. He was a priest in Nitra, where he gained a Th.D. in 1991, and was then was seminary rector of St. Gorazd in Nitra (1996–2001)  and then Dean of Comenius University in Bratislava (2001–2004). He is an academic with specialties in Christian antiquity and the medieval Slovak church history and is the author of several monographs in the field of church history, and many books, articles and publications. He speaks German and Italian.
 
He was ordained on 16 June 1985 in Nitra, and made Bishop by Pope Benedict XVI on 9 June 2005.   Since 2006, he has been the vice-president of the Slovak Bishops' Conference. Within the KBS he also acts as chairman of the Commission for the Clergy, Subcommittee for the permanent diaconate, music Subcommittee liturgical Commission and the council to history. On 10 October 2022, during 103rd plenary session of the Conference, Judák was elected the Vice-President of the Conference under Presidency of Metropolitan Archbishop Bernard Bober.

He was awarded the Matica Slovakia.

Literary works 
 Judák, Viliam. Archbishop holy life. (Bratislava Luc Episcopal Office in Nitra, 1992)
 Judák, Viliam. Calvary national saints. Illustrations Bebjak, Louis. (Nitra: Kňazský seminar St. Gorazd, 1996). 
 Judák, Viliam; Hank, Igor. By Gorazd to gorazdovcom. Obál. Norbert Pšenčík. (Nitra: Kňazský seminar St. Gorazd, 1994). 
 Judák, Viliam. Jubilee years in history. Translation Kostal, Anton. (Nitra: Kňazský seminar St. Gorazd, 1997.) 
 Judák, Viliam. The Bishopric of Nitra in history. Novotna, Marta (FOT). (Bratislava: Institute for State-Church Relations, 1999). 
 Judák, Viliam. Sv. Svorad – patron of the city of Nitra. (Nitra: Kňazský seminar St. Gorazd, 1999). 
 Judák, Viliam; Poláčik, Stefan. List patrocínií in Slovakia. Ed. Viliam Judák: Stefan Poláčik; Eva Benčíková resume translation. (Bratislava: Roman Catholic Theology Faculty, 2009). 
 Judák, William, et al., Nitra Castle and Cathedral – Basilica of St. Emeráma. Illustration photo: Matej Plekanec, Vladimir Plekanec, Joseph Medvecký. (Nitra Bishop's Office, 2012).

References

1959 births
Living people
Academic staff of Comenius University
21st-century Roman Catholic bishops in Slovakia
Slovak writers
People from Čadca District
Bishops of Nitra